Rolfo may refer to:

 Rolfo, an Italian manufacturer of truck superstructures
 Béatrice Fresko-Rolfo, a Monegasque politician
 Fridolina Rolfö, a Swedish footballer 
 Jemina Rolfo, a Uruguayan footballer
 Roberto Rolfo, a professional motorcycle road racer